This is a list of universities in Bonaire.

Universities 
 Augusta Bouwkundig Adviesbureau
 Avalon University School of Medicine - Bonaire campus
 Saint James School of Medicine - Bonaire campus

See also 
 List of universities by country

References

Universities
Bonaire
Bonaire

Universities